Jukka Einar Virtanen (born July 15, 1959) is a retired professional ice hockey player who played in the SM-liiga.  He played for Ässät and TPS.  He also won a silver medal at the 1988 Winter Olympics.

Career statistics

Regular season and playoffs

International

External links 

1959 births
Living people
Ässät players
Finnish ice hockey defencemen
Ice hockey players at the 1988 Winter Olympics
Olympic ice hockey players of Finland
Olympic medalists in ice hockey
Olympic silver medalists for Finland
HC TPS players
Sportspeople from Turku